Teen Time Tunes was a 1949 American television show broadcast on the now-defunct DuMont Television Network.

Broadcast History
The 15-minute weeknight show featured singer Sue Bennett and the musical group The Alan Logan Trio.  Bennett (known at the time as Sue Benjamin) later worked with Kay Kyser and went on to appear on many other 1950s TV shows. The show aired from March 7 to July 5, 1949l, or March 14, 1949, to July 15, 1949.

In contrast to the title, the low-budget show featured mostly musical standards.

Episode status
As with most DuMont series, no episodes are known to exist.

See also
List of programs broadcast by the DuMont Television Network
List of surviving DuMont Television Network broadcasts

References

Bibliography
David Weinstein, The Forgotten Network: DuMont and the Birth of American Television (Philadelphia: Temple University Press, 2004) 
Alex McNeil, Total Television, Fourth edition (New York: Penguin Books, 1980) 
Tim Brooks and Earle Marsh, The Complete Directory to Prime Time Network TV Shows, Third edition (New York: Ballantine Books, 1964)

External links
Teen Time Tunes at IMDB
DuMont historical website

DuMont Television Network original programming
1949 American television series debuts
1949 American television series endings
Black-and-white American television shows
Lost American television shows